False Servant is a 2000 French comedy-drama film directed by Benoît Jacquot and starring Isabelle Huppert.

Plot
A young woman disguises herself as a knight to expose a gold-digging man divided between her and a Countess.

Cast
 Isabelle Huppert as The Countess
 Sandrine Kiberlain as The Knight
 Pierre Arditi as Trivelin
 Mathieu Amalric as Lélio
 Alexandre Soulié as Arlequin
 Philippe Vieux as Frontin

See also
 Isabelle Huppert on screen and stage

References

External links

2000 films
2000 comedy-drama films
2000s French-language films
Films directed by Benoît Jacquot
French films based on plays
French comedy-drama films
Cross-dressing in film
2000s French films